David Lyman may refer to:

 David Lyman, creator of NutshellMail, a social network aggregation service
 David Belden Lyman (1803–1884), American missionary to Hawaii